Toni Bradshaw (born 25 February 1976) is a road cyclist from New Zealand. She represented her nation at the 2005, 2006, 2007 and 2010 UCI Road World Championships.

References

External links
 profile at Procyclingstats.com

1976 births
New Zealand female cyclists
Living people
Place of birth missing (living people)
Cyclists at the 2006 Commonwealth Games
Commonwealth Games competitors for New Zealand